Sir George Gunning, 2nd Baronet (1763–1823), of Horton, Northamptonshire, was an English politician.

He was a Member of Parliament (MP) for Wigan 21 June 1800 – 1802, Hastings 1802 – 1806 and East Grinstead 9 March 1812 – May 1812 and 1812 – 1818.

Personal life
Gunning married Hon. Elizabeth Bridgeman, daughter of Henry Bridgeman, 1st Baron Bradford on 10 February 1794.
Sir Robert Henry Gunning, 3rd Baronet, (26 December 1795 - 22 September 1862)
George Orlando Gunning, (18 December 1796 - 18 June 1815), died as a Lieutenant in the 10th Hussars at the Battle of Waterloo
Rev. Sir Henry Gunning, 4th Baronet (17 December 1797 - 30 June 1885), married, firstly, Mary Catherine Cartwright, daughter of William Ralph Cartwright and secondly, Frances Rose Spencer daughter of Rev. Hon. William Henry Spencer (son of Francis Spencer, 1st Baron Churchill)
Captain Orlando George Gunning-Sutton, RN (12 May 1799 - 5 May 1852), married Mary Dorothea Seymour, daughter of Sir Michael Seymour, 1st Baronet
Reverend Spencer Greswolde Gunning JP (27 October 1800 - 29 May 1867), married Anne Janette Connell, daughter of James Connell
Major John Gunning (21 December 1801 - 13 October 1845), married Jessie Babington, daughter of Rev. Charles Babington

References

Baronets in the Baronetage of Great Britain
People from West Northamptonshire District
1763 births
1823 deaths
Politicians from Northamptonshire
Members of the Parliament of Great Britain for English constituencies
British MPs 1796–1800
UK MPs 1801–1802
UK MPs 1802–1806
UK MPs 1807–1812
UK MPs 1812–1818
Members of the Parliament of the United Kingdom for English constituencies